Hugh Vaughan was an English Member of Parliament during the reign of Queen Elizabeth I. He was The Earl of Bedford's steward in the west of England, and entered parliament at a by-election for Bridport in 1581 as the Earl's nominee to replace his heir, Lord Russell, who had been summoned to sit in the House of Lords. He subsequently also represented Dartmouth (in the Parliament of 1584), Plymouth (1586) and Tavistock (1593).

References
 J E Neale, The Elizabethan House of Commons (London: Jonathan Cape, 1949)

Year of birth missing
Year of death missing
Members of the Parliament of England for Plymouth
English MPs 1572–1583
English MPs 1584–1585
English MPs 1586–1587
English MPs 1593
Members of the Parliament of England for Tavistock
Members of the Parliament of England for Dartmouth